John Porter (1886 – after 1909) was an English professional footballer who played as a centre-half.

References

1886 births
English footballers
Association football defenders
Skinningrove F.C. players
Grimsby Town F.C. players
English Football League players
Year of death missing